Luke Joseph Duffy (1890 – 3 August 1961) was an Irish trades unionist and Labour Party politician, who served for five years as a Senator.

Born in Gurteen, County Sligo in 1890, Duffy's first job was as a draper's apprentice in Moon's of Galway. By 1910, he was an active member of the local branch of the Irish Drapers' Assistants Association (IDAA), and he was elected branch secretary in 1911. In the following years, he was vice-president and trustee of the Trades Council, secretary of the Volunteers and of the Galway City Gaelic Athletic Association, and active in the Irish National Foresters. In 1914, he chaired the IDAA's annual conference in Dublin. Sacked from Moon's for union activity in 1916, he was appointed Munster organiser of the IDAA. A few years later, he was elected as general secretary of the renamed Irish Distributive and Administrative Trade Union. In 1933, he became general secretary of the  Labour Party.

In 1944, he was elected by the Industrial and Commercial Panel as a member of the 5th Seanad. He was re-elected in 1948 to the 6th Seanad, but resigned when appointed to the board of the newly established Industrial Development Authority for Industry and Commerce (IDAIC), by Daniel Morrissey, Minister for Industry and Commerce. This appointment was for a term of five years through 25 May 1954. He resigned from the Senate to accept this appointment and also relinquished his position as General Secretary of the Labour Party.

In his appointment to the IDAIC Duffy worked at developing strategies that would ultimately lead to attracting direct foreign investment into Ireland. The IDAIC was placed on statutory footing in 1950. Duffy spent the rest of his career in advancing the aims and objectives of the IDAIC.

Duffy died on 3 August 1961, in Dún Laoghaire, at 71 years of age.

References

Sources
 John Cunningham, 'Labour in the West of Ireland: working life and struggle, 1890-1914', Athol Books (Belfast) 1995.
 Duffy family correspondence, gathered for Duffy Family History to be published in 2013

1890 births
1961 deaths
Irish trade unionists
Labour Party (Ireland) senators
Members of the 5th Seanad
Members of the 6th Seanad
Politicians from County Sligo